Duchess Magdalene of Jülich-Cleves-Berg (2 November 1553 – 30 August 1633) was the fifth child of Duke William "the Rich" of Jülich-Cleves-Berg and Maria of Austria, a daughter of Emperor Ferdinand I.

She married in 1579 with Count Palatine John I the Lame of Zweibrücken.  Emperor Charles V had in 1546 granted the Duchy of Jülich-Cleves-Berg the right of female succession.  So, when her brother, Duke John William, died in 1609 without a male heir of his own, both she and William's daughters could play a vital role in the question of who would inherit the important northwest German territory.  Magdalene's husband John claimed the inheritance for Palatinate-Zweibrücken, as did the Elector of Brandenburg, John Sigismund, who was married to Anna, a daughter of Magdalena's sister Marie Eleonore (John Sigismund claimed his marriage contract from 1573 gave him the best claim).  The third claimant was Count Palatine Philip Louis of Neuburg, the husband of Magdalen's other sister Anna.  Finally, the Duchy of Saxony claimed Jülich-Cleves-Berg, based on an agreement to that effect with the Emperor.

Since all claimants were members of comprehensive European coalitions and so the Habsburgs and France were indirectly involved, an international conflict threatened: the War of the Jülich succession.  However, after King Henry IV of France died, the conflict could be settled provisionally by the Treaty of Xanten.  The duchy was divided between Brandenburg and Palatinate-Neuburg.  In the meantime, Magdalena's husband had died in 1604 and his claim had been inherited by her eldest son John II (1584–1635), who did not receive a share under the Treaty of Xanten.

Magdalene's daughter Elisabeth (1581–1637) married Georg Gustav, Count Palatine of Pfalz-Veldenz.  She also had two younger sons: Frederick Casimir (1585–1645) and John Casimir (1589–1652). She died in 1633 and was buried in the Reformed Church of Meisenheim.

1553 births
1633 deaths
16th-century German people
16th-century German women
17th-century German people
17th-century German women
Duchesses of Berg
Duchesses of Cleves
Duchesses of Jülich
House of La Marck